Edgeir Reidar Benum (born 13 October 1939) is a Norwegian historian.

He was born in Verdal, and is the younger brother of athlete Pål Benum. He graduated from the University of Oslo with a cand.philol. degree in 1967, and worked as a scholarship holder there from 1968 to 1972. He then became a professor in history at the University of Tromsø from 1972 to 1980 and then at the University of Oslo since 1980. He has twice been a visiting scholar at the University of California, Berkeley. He is a member of the Norwegian Academy of Science and Letters.

Selected bibliography
This is a list of his most notable works:

Maktsentra og opposisjon. Spaniasaken i Norge 1946-47, 1969. 
Sentraladministrasjonens historie. volume 2, 1979. 
Byråkratienes by. Fra 1948 til våre dager. volume 5 of Oslo bys historie, 1994.
Overflod og fremtidsfrykt, volume 12 of Aschehougs norgeshistorie, 1998.

References

List of publications in FRIDA

1939 births
Living people
20th-century Norwegian historians
University of Oslo alumni
Academic staff of the University of Tromsø
Academic staff of the University of Oslo
Members of the Norwegian Academy of Science and Letters
People from Verdal
21st-century Norwegian historians